There have been several elective constituencies called Ayrshire:

 Ayrshire (Parliament of Scotland constituency); 1605-1707
 Ayrshire (UK Parliament constituency); 1708-1868
 South Ayrshire (UK Parliament constituency); 1868-1983
 North Ayrshire (UK Parliament constituency); 1868-1918
 Bute and Northern Ayrshire (UK Parliament constituency); 1918-1983
 Central Ayrshire (UK Parliament constituency); 1950-1983 and since 2005
 North Ayrshire and Arran (UK Parliament constituency); since 2005

See also
 Ayr (constituency)
 Ayrshire (disambiguation)

Constituencies in the United Kingdom
Parliament of Scotland